The United States sent a delegation to compete at the 2004 Summer Paralympics in Athens, Greece. A total of 235 U.S. competitors took part in 18 sports; the only sport Americans did not compete in was soccer 5-a-side.  The United States finished fourth in the gold and overall medal count, behind China, Great Britain and Canada.

Medalists

The following American athletes won medals at the games.

| width="78%" align="left" valign="top" |

| width="22%" align="left" valign="top" |

Competitors

Archery

Men

|-
|align=left|Aaron Cross
|align=left|Men's individual W1
|587
|10
|Bye
|L 150-150
|colspan="4"|Did not advance
|-
|align=left|Jeffrey Fabry
|align=left|Men's individual W1
|667 WR
|1
|colspan="2"|Bye
|W 109-102
|L 108-108
|W 108-96
|
|-
|align=left|Chuck Lear
|align=left|Men's individual W1
|585
|11
|Bye
|L 133-150
|colspan="4"|Did not advance
|-
|align=left|Kevin Stone
|align=left|Men's individual W2
|595
|16
|W 147-145
|L 152-162
|colspan="4"|Did not advance
|-
|align=left|Kevin Stone Jeffrey Fabry Aaron Cross
|align=left|Men's teams open
|1859
|2
|colspan="2"|Bye
|W 226-223
|L 0-215
|W 231-212
|
|}

Women

|-
|align=left|Lindsey Carmichael
|align=left|Women's individual standing
|603 WR
|1
|N/A
|W 145-113
|L 91-98
|colspan="3"|Did not advance
|}

Athletics

Men's track

Men's field

Women's track

Women's field

Boccia

Cycling

Men's road

Men's track

Women's road

Women's track

Equestrian

Individual

Mixed team

Football 7-a-side
The men's football team didn't win any medals: they were 8th out of 8.

Players
Derek Arneaud
Josh Blue
Keith Johnson
Tom Latsch
Jon McCullough
Joshua McKinney
Michael Peters
Jason Slemons
John Theobold
Chris Wolf
Eli Wolff
David Woosnam

Results

Goalball

Men's team
The men's team won a bronze medal in goalball.

Players
Christopher Dodds
Daniel Gallant
Tyler Merren
Donte Mickens
John Mulhern Jr.
Edward Munro

Results

Women's team
The women's team won a silver medal in goalball.

Players
Jennifer Armbruster
Lisa Banta
Nicole Buck
Jessica Lorenz
Asya Miller
Robin Theryoung

Results

Judo

Men

Women

Powerlifting

Sailing

Swimming

Men

Women

Table tennis

Men

Women

Volleyball

Men's team
The men's volleyball team didn't win any medals: they were place 6th out of 8.

Players
Rene Aquino
Eric Duda
Joey Evans
Essam Hamido
Tracey Lange
Curtis Lease
Jeffrey MacMunn
Paul Moran
Robert Osbahr
Brent Rasmussen
Chris Seilkop
William Steen

Results

Women's team
The women's volleyball team won a bronze medal.

Players
Allison Ahlfeldt
Allison Aldrich
Bonnie Brawner
Lori Daniels
Kendra Lancastier
Hope Lewellen
Brenda Maymon
Gina McWilliams
Erica Moyers
Penny Ricker
Deborah Vosler
Lora Webster

Results

Wheelchair basketball

Men's team
The men's team didn't win any medals. They were 7th out of 12.

Players
Juan Angulo
Gavin Cloy
Jeff Dills
Jeffrey James Glasbrenner
Jeffrey Griffin
Lawrence Johnson
Jeremy Lade
Jason Nelms
Mike Paye
Jermell Pennie
Matt Scott
Josh Turek

Results

Women's team
The women's team won the gold medal in wheelchair basketball.

Players
Patricia Cisneros
Janna Crawford
Carlee Hoffman
Emily Hoskins
Jennifer Howitt
Susan Katz
Teresa Lannon
Christina Ripp
Jana Stump
Renee Tyree
Jennifer Warkins
Stephanie Walker

Results

Wheelchair fencing

Men

Women

Wheelchair tennis

Men

Women

Quads

See also 
 United States at the 2004 Summer Olympics
 United States at the Paralympics

References

External links
International Paralympic Committee Official Website
United States Paralympic Committee Official Website

Nations at the 2004 Summer Paralympics
2004
Paralympics